The 48th Texas Legislature met from January 12, 1943, to May 11, 1943. All members present during this session were elected in the 1942 general elections.

Sessions

Regular Session: January 12, 1945 – May 11, 1945

Party summary

Senate

House

Officers

Senate
 Lieutenant Governor: John Lee Smith (D) 
 President Pro Tempore: Vernon Lemens (D), Fred Mauritz (D), A. M. Aikin, Jr. (D)

House
 Speaker of the House: Price Daniel (D)

Members

Senate

Dist. 1
 E. Harold Beck (D), Texarkana

Dist. 2
 Wardlow Lane (D), Center

Dist. 3
 Ben Ramsey (D), San Augustine

Dist. 4
 Allan Shivers (D), Port Arthur

Dist. 5
 Clement Fain (D), Livingston

Dist. 6
 Clay Cotten (D), Palestine

Dist. 7
 T. C. Chadick (D), Quitman

Dist. 8
 A. M. Aiken, Jr. (D), Paris

Dist. 9
 Charles R. Jones (D), Bonham

Dist. 10
 G. C. Morris (D), Greenville

Dist. 11
 William Graves (D), Dallas

Dist. 12
 Vernon Lemmons (D), Waxahachie

Dist. 13
 Kyle Vick (D), Waco

Dist. 14
 Joseph Alton York (D), Bryan

Dist. 15
 Louis Sulak (D), La Grange

Dist. 16
 Weaver Moore (D), Houston

Dist. 17
 William Stone (D), Galveston

Dist. 18
 Fred Mauritz (D), Ganado

Dist. 19
 Rudolph A. Weinert (D), Seguin

Dist. 20
 Houghton Brownlee (D), Austin

Dist. 21
 Karl Lovelady (D), Meridian

Dist. 22
 Royston Lanning (D), Jacksboro

Dist. 23
 George Moffett (D), Chillicothe

Dist. 24
 Pat Bullock (D), Snyder

Dist. 25
 Penrose Metcalfe (D), San Angelo

Dist. 26
 J. Franklin Spears (D), San Antonio

Dist. 27
 Rogers Kelly (D), Edinburg

Dist. 28
 Jesse Martin (D), Fort Worth

Dist. 29
 Henry L. Winfield (D), Fort Stockton

Dist. 30
 Marshall Formby (D), McAdoo

Dist. 31
 Grady Hazlewood (D), Amarillo

House
The House was composed of 150 Democrats.

House members included future Governors Price Daniel and Preston Smith.

Sources
Legislative Reference Library of Texas

External links

48th Texas Legislature
1943 in Texas
1943 U.S. legislative sessions